Muhammad Dzaky Asraf Huwaidi Syam (born 6 February 2003) is an Indonesian professional footballer who plays as a winger or right-back for Liga 1 club PSM Makassar and the Indonesia national under-20 team.

Club career

PSM Makassar
He was signed for PSM Makassar to play in Liga 1 in the 2022 season. Dzaky made his league debut on 23 July 2022 in a match against PSS Sleman at the Maguwoharjo Stadium, Sleman.

International career
On 28 October 2022, Dzaky made his first cap for the Indonesia U-20 national team for a friendly match against Turkey U-20 in a 1-2 loss. He received a call to join the  senior team in November 2022 as a preliminary squad for 2022 AFF Championship.

Career statistics

Club

Notes

Honours

Individual
 Liga 1 Young Player of the Month: December 2022

References

External links
 Dzaky Asraf at Soccerway
 Dzaky Asraf at Liga Indonesia

2003 births
Living people
Sportspeople from West Sulawesi
Indonesian footballers
PSM Makassar players
Liga 1 (Indonesia) players
Association football forwards